Gilles Roux (born 20 January 1971) is a French speedcuber primarily known for inventing a 3x3x3 Rubik's Cube method, the Roux Method, and achieving fast times with it.

World Cube Association 
Gilles Roux was a member of the World Cube Association Board from October 2004 until 1 November 2008. During his time as a board member, Gilles helped organize many competitions as a WCA delegate. He also contributed to WCA by creating much needed regulations which would in turn help out cubers all over the world. Presently, Gilles is a technical advisor for the WCA and assists when needed.

ROUX method  
Over a span of years, Gilles Roux developed his own method to solve the 3x3x3 cube. Using a smaller quantity of memorized algorithms than most methods of solving, Roux still found his method to be fast and efficient. The first step of the Roux method is to form a 3×2×1 block. The 3×2×1 block is usually placed in the lower portion of the left layer. The second step is to create another 3×2×1 on the opposite side. The remaining four corners are then solved using a set of algorithms known as CMLL (Corners of the Last Layer, without regards to the M-slice), which leaves six edges and four centers that are solved in the last step.

Official results 
For official results, solves must be completed in a competition held by the WCA. In competition, Gilles has recorded a single solve of 10.06 seconds, ranking him just out the top one thousand solvers in the world (as of 1 January 2015). His best average of 5 was set on 16 September 2011 at 13.03. Also his greatest achieved fewest moves competition for the standard 3x3x3 is 31, being part of the "31 club", coming to a draw with another known cuber and creator of popular method of solving, Lars Petrus.

See also
 Rubik's Cube
 Speedcubing
 Jessica Fridrich
 Lars Petrus
 World Cube Association

References 
 

1971 births
Living people
French speedcubers